The 11th Pan American Games were held in Havana, Cuba from August 2 to August 18, 1991.

Medals

Gold

Men's 20 km Walk: Héctor Moreno

Men's Team Time Trial (Road): Ruber Marín, Juan de Dios Fajardo, Héctor Palacio, and Asdrúbal Patiño

Men's 1500 m: Guillermo Botero
Men's Team 10,000 m: Guillermo Botero, Orlando Valencia, and Sergio Pino

Men's Pistol: Bernardo Tovar

Silver

Women's 200 metres: Ximena Restrepo
Women's 400 metres: Ximena Restrepo

Men's 4.000m Points Race (Track): Jairo Giraldo

Men's Lightweight (– 67.5 kg): Eyne Acevedo
Men's Middleweight (– 75 kg): Álvaro Velasco

Men's Greco-Roman (– 57 kg): Víctor Capacho

Bronze

Men's Javelin: Luis Lucumí

Men's Light Flyweight (– 48 kg): Fernando Retayud

Men's 1.000m Match Sprint (Track): Jhon González

Men's Bantamweight (– 56 kg): Carlos David
Men's Featherweight (– 60 kg): John Salazar
Men's Heavyweight (– 110 kg): Humberto Gómez

See also
Colombia at the 1992 Summer Olympics

References
El Tiempo

Nations at the 1991 Pan American Games
P
Colombia at the Pan American Games